is a town located in Kamikawa Subprefecture, Hokkaido, Japan.

As of September 2016, the town has an estimated population of 3,293, and a density of 25 persons per km2.

Culture

Mascot

She is a reticent but friendly and curious llama from Palcamayo, Peru to reside in Viva Alpaca Farm in January 2013 from Kenbuchi's Peruvian community after reading a Christmas card. She became mascot on 17 February 2013. Her hobbies are visiting events and collecting picture books. She is a vegetarian. As a result, she pays homage to the immigrants to Japan. She has a brother named . Her birthday is the same day as the Kenbuchi Shrine Festival (12 July). According to Andean legend, her heart contains a mysterious power that causes happiness.

References

External links

 Official Website 

Towns in Hokkaido